Karl Wilhelm Ramler (25 February 1725 – 11 April 1798) was a German poet, Berlin Cadet School master.

Ramler was born in Kolberg. After graduating from the University of Halle, he went to Berlin, where, in 1748, he was appointed professor of logic and literature at the cadet school. In 1786 he became associated with the author Johann Jakob Engel in the management of the royal theatre, of which, after resigning his professorship, he became sole director from 1790-96. He died in Berlin and his memorial is to be seen on the exterior wall of the city's Sophienkirche.

References

1725 births
1798 deaths
People from Kołobrzeg
People from the Province of Pomerania
German male poets
University of Halle alumni
Members of the Prussian Academy of Sciences
French–German translators
Latin–German translators
German Freemasons